The River Derreen is a large river in the southeast of Ireland.  It rises on central Lugnaquilla Mountain in the western Wicklow Mountains and flows south from Lugnaquilla Mountain and then southwest to join the River Slaney south of Tullow, passing close to Hacketstown and Tullow, Co. Carlow before it joins the Slaney upstream of Aghade bridge. Running through tillage and pastureland in its lower reaches, the Derreen with its sandy, gravelly bottom is a prime salmon spawning tributary of the Slaney. 
Passing through counties Wicklow and Carlow, it is the first large, major tributary of the River Slaney.

Towns on the Derreen include Hacketstown and Tullow. It is crossed mainly by old humpbacked stone bridges. It is a rural river, flowing through only 2 major towns.

Wildlife
The River Derreen holds occasional salmon in the spring but the upper reaches are better known for trout, averaging 0.5lbs. The best of the fishing is from March to June. It is primarily a Brown Trout fishery.  In season, brown trout, salmon, sea trout and occasional pike are fished. There are two angling clubs with fishing rights on the Derreen River and the remainder is in private hands. It also a habitat of the freshwater pearl mussel.

See also
Rivers of Ireland

References

Rivers of County Wicklow
Rivers of County Carlow
Rivers of County Wexford
Wexford, County Wexford